Knockmaree Dolmen, or Knockmaree Cist, is a prehistoric site of the Neolithic period, in Phoenix Park just north of Chapelizod, near Dublin, Ireland. Other forms of the name are Knockmary or Knockmaroon Dolmen, or Cnoc-Maraidhe.

Description
The tomb, situated on a small ridge, is a cist, a type of burial chamber found in Ireland on the south and east coast. The capstone is water-worn, and is thought to have come from the River Liffey nearby.

It was discovered in 1838, when workmen were employed to remove a tumulus of height  and circumference . In the centre of the mound were found the stones now visible; four other cists were found in the outer area.

The remains were examined by the Royal Irish Academy, the Academy's report later being delivered by George Petrie.

They were almost complete and aged about 40 and 50 years. Grave goods were found including many small perforated sea-shells (of species known then as Nerita litoralis), which presumably formed a necklace, and a flint knife. In the outer cists, an urn and food vessels were found, with fragments of burnt bone and ashes.

The tomb is known as a "Linkardstown burial", after a megalithic grave found in the townland of Linkardstown, south-east of Carlow. There is a group of such burials, having mounds of similar size and situated on a hilltop or similar location.

The tomb was repaired in 1973 and in the 1990s, including the addition of a concrete block to support the capstone.

Damage 
In the 1970s the tomb was damaged by fire which resulted in cracks in the capstone. These were subsequently fixed with concrete.

In early 2023, the tomb was further damaged with a part of the capstone broken off. Tire tracks around the tomb indicate it may have been struck by machinery. The Office of Public Works stated that the damage had resulted from the failure of the earlier repairs. Since the 1990s, requests have been made to further protect the site with fencing and signage.

See also
 Irish megalithic tombs
 List of megalithic monuments in Ireland

References

Archaeological sites in County Dublin
Phoenix Park